Borač may refer to places:

Borač (fortress), a fortified town in medieval Bosnia
Borač, Czech Republic, a municipality and village
Borač, Serbia, a village near Knić in Serbia
Borač Fortress near Borač in Serbia

See also
Boračko Lake, a lake in Bosnia and Herzegovina